Bellgrove Railway Station is in the East End of Glasgow, Scotland, serving the city's Calton, Gallowgate and south Dennistoun neighbourhoods.

The station is accessed from Bellgrove Street via stairs, and is approximately a mile (2 km) away from Celtic Park.

History
The station opened in 1871 on the North British Railways Coatbridge branch and the City of Glasgow Union Railway cross-city line from Shields Junction. Services on the Coatbridge route did not run there however, the NBR instead using a separate terminus known as College situated on the end of a short spur from the CGUR route southwest of Bellgrove. This only lasted until 1886, when the Glasgow City and District Railway was opened from  via a low level station at Queen Street to join the CGUR at High Street East Junction. This was henceforth used by all services from the Coatbridge &  direction and also by the newly inaugurated passenger services to Springburn (trains had been progressively introduced on the route prior to this, but only as far as ).

The North British company took over the CGUR in 1896 jointly with the Glasgow and South Western Railway, operating all services on the Springburn line thereafter.  Local traffic on the remainder of the line from St Enoch declined in the face of strong competition from the local tram network and by 1902, the one intermediate station at Gallowgate had been closed.  Services continued to run from St Enoch to  until 1913, but thereafter the line was only used by freight & parcels traffic, periodic excursions & other special trains.

Services beyond Airdrie were withdrawn by British Railways in January 1956, whilst St Enoch closed to passengers a decade later in June 1966 and was subsequently demolished.  One more positive development was the North Clyde Line electrification scheme of 1960, which brought overhead wiring to the Queen St LL - Airdrie & Springburn routes in November that year.

Bellgrove rail crash 

On 6 March 1989, the station was the scene of a head-on collision between two  trains on the Springburn branch in which two people died.

Services

From 2010 

In the evening, four trains per hour go towards Glasgow Queen Street and there is a half-hourly service to both Springburn and Edinburgh.

On Sundays, there is a half-hourly service westbound to Glasgow Queen Street and Helensburgh Central and eastbound to Edinburgh.

2013-14 

Westbound there are six trains per hour to Glasgow Queen St and points west (two each to Helensburgh Central, Balloch via Singer, and Dalmuir via Yoker).  Milngavie services usually only call at peak periods.  Westbound there are four trains to Airdrie and two to Springburn each hour, with two of the Airdrie trains continuing to Edinburgh.

In the evenings there are two trains per hour each to Springburn and Edinburgh eastbound and to Balloch via Singer and Helensburgh via Yoker westbound.

The Sunday service remains unchanged from 2010.

2016 

The basic 6 tph frequency remains unchanged in both directions, but the destinations served have been altered as part of the December 2014 timetable recast.  Westbound trains now run to Milngavie, Balloch via Singer and Dumbarton Central via Yoker (2tph to each), whilst eastbound there are services to Springburn and Cumbernauld, Airdrie (4tph) and Edinburgh (2tph). On Sundays there are 2tph on the Edinburgh to Helensburgh Central route each way calling and 1 tph between Partick and Cumbernauld.

2018 

Changes to the timetable in December 2018 have seen Springburn become the northern terminus for branch services once more (passengers to destinations beyond have to change there once more), though the service frequency remains otherwise unaltered.

Routes

References

Notes

Sources 
 
 

SPT railway stations
Railway stations in Glasgow
Former North British Railway stations
Railway stations in Great Britain opened in 1871
Railway stations served by ScotRail
Bridgeton–Calton–Dalmarnock